Knox Atoll (Marshallese:) is an uninhabited  coral atoll of 18 islands in the Pacific Ocean, and is the southernmost atoll of the Ratak Chain of the Marshall Islands. The largest islets, located on the western and northern sides, include Aelingeo, Nadikdik and Nariktal. The atoll is separated by the Klee Passage from the southern point of Mili Atoll to which it was once connected.

History
Knox Atoll was claimed by the Empire of Germany along with the rest of the Marshall Islands in 1884. After World War I, the island came under the South Seas Mandate of the Empire of Japan. Following the end of World War II, it came under the control of the United States as part of the Trust Territory of the Pacific Islands until the independence of the Marshall Islands in 1986.

Typhoon
On 30 June 1905 the atoll of Nadikdik was completely washed over by a huge typhoon that stripped the atoll down to the bare coral.  Almost all of the some 60 inhabitants perished, save by two boys who survived a 24-hour drift voyage clinging on a breadfruit tree. In the century since then, the islands have largely regenerated.

See also
 Desert island
 List of islands

Notes

References
Marshall Islands site

1905 Typhoon
Nadikdik geomorphic adjustment & regeneration

Atolls of the Marshall Islands
Ratak Chain
Uninhabited islands of the Marshall Islands